"I'm Right Here" is a song by Irish singer Samantha Mumba, the lead single released from her aborted second studio album, Woman (2002). The single was released on 12 August 2002 in the United States and on 14 October 2002 in the United Kingdom. The song reached number three in Ireland and number five in the United Kingdom. It also reached number 32 in Australia and number 51 in Germany.

Music video
The video for "I'm Right Here" (directed by Darren Grant), features Samantha Mumba and a group of girls in fireman-type outfits hosing down unfaithful men with a fire hose riding in a firetruck. Jamaican deejay Damian Marley, son of reggae singer Bob Marley, and dancer Cris Judd are featured in the video.

Track listings

UK CD1
 "I'm Right Here"	  	
 "Sensuality"	  	
 "I'm Right Here" (Crash Vocal Mix) 	  	
 "I'm Right Here" (video)

UK CD2
 "I'm Right Here"
 "Gotta Tell You"
 "Always Come Back to Your Love"
 "Gotta Tell You" (video)

UK cassette single
A1. "I'm Right Here"
B1. "Gotta Tell You"
B2. "Always Come Back to Your Love"

European CD single
 "I'm Right Here"
 "Wish Upon a Star"

Australian CD single
 "I'm Right Here"
 "I'm Right Here" (featuring Damian Marley)
 "Wish Upon a Star"
 "I'm Right Here" (video)

Credits and personnel
Credits are lifted from the UK CD1 liner notes.

Studios
 Recorded at Murlyn Studios (Stockholm, Sweden), Record Plant Recording Studios, and Royaltone Studios (Los Angeles)
 Mixed at Record Plant Recording Studios (Los Angeles)
 Mastered at Oasis Mastering (Burbank, California)

Personnel

 Kandi Burruss – writing, background vocals, additional vocal production
 Bloodshy & Avant – production, arrangement, recording
 Pontus Winnberg – writing
 Christian Karlsson – writing
 Henrik Jonback – writing
 Toya Smith – background vocals
 Henrik Jonback – guitar
 John Goux – guitar
 Alex Al – bass guitar
 Luis Conte – percussion
 Jerry Hey – horn
 Gary Grant – horn
 Larry Williams – horn
 Tony Maserati – mixing
 Eddy Schreyer – mastering

Charts

Weekly charts

Year-end charts

Release history

References

2002 singles
2002 songs
A&M Records singles
Music videos directed by Darren Grant
Polydor Records singles
Samantha Mumba songs
Song recordings produced by Bloodshy & Avant
Songs written by Christian Karlsson (DJ)
Songs written by Henrik Jonback
Songs written by Kandi Burruss
Songs written by Pontus Winnberg